BSD licenses are a family of permissive free software licenses, imposing minimal restrictions on the use and distribution of covered software. This is in contrast to copyleft licenses, which have share-alike requirements. The original BSD license was used for its namesake, the Berkeley Software Distribution (BSD), a Unix-like operating system. The original version has since been revised, and its descendants are referred to as modified BSD licenses.

BSD is both a license and a class of license (generally referred to as BSD-like). The modified BSD license (in wide use today) is very similar to the license originally used for the BSD version of Unix. The BSD license is a simple license that merely requires that all code retain the BSD license notice if redistributed in source code format, or reproduce the notice if redistributed in binary format. The BSD license (unlike some other licenses e.g. GPL) does not require that source code be distributed at all.

Terms 

In addition to the original (4-clause) license used for BSD, several derivative licenses have emerged that are also commonly referred to as a "BSD license". Today, the typical BSD license is the 3-clause version, which is revised from the original 4-clause version.

In all BSD licenses as following, <year> is the year of the copyright. As published in BSD, <copyright holder> is "Regents of the University of California".

Previous license 

Some releases of BSD prior to the adoption of the 4-clause BSD license used a license that is clearly ancestral to the 4-clause BSD license. These releases include some parts of 4.3BSD-Tahoe (1988), about 1000 files, and Net/1 (1989). Although largely replaced by the 4-clause license, this license can be found in 4.3BSD-Reno, Net/2, and 4.4BSD-Alpha.

4-clause license (original "BSD License") 

The original BSD license contained a clause not found in later licenses, known as the "advertising clause". This clause eventually became controversial, as it required authors of all works deriving from a BSD-licensed work to include an acknowledgment of the original source in all advertising material. This was clause number 3 in the original license text:

This clause was objected to on the grounds that as people changed the license to reflect their name or organization it led to escalating advertising requirements when programs were combined in a software distribution: every occurrence of the license with a different name required a separate acknowledgment. In arguing against it, Richard Stallman has stated that he counted 75 such acknowledgments in a 1997 version of NetBSD. In addition, the clause presented a legal problem for those wishing to publish BSD-licensed software which relies upon separate programs using the GNU GPL: the advertising clause is incompatible with the GPL, which does not allow the addition of restrictions beyond those it already imposes; because of this, the GPL's publisher, the Free Software Foundation, recommends developers not use the license, though it states there is no reason not to use software already using it.

3-clause license ("BSD License 2.0", "Revised BSD License", "New BSD License", or "Modified BSD License") 

The advertising clause was removed from the license text in the official BSD license on July 22, 1999, by William Hoskins, Director of the Office of Technology Licensing for UC Berkeley. Other BSD distributions removed the clause, but many similar clauses remain in BSD-derived code from other sources, and unrelated code using a derived license.

While the original license is sometimes referred to as the "BSD-old", the resulting 3-clause version is sometimes referred to by "BSD-new." Other names include new BSD, "revised BSD", "BSD-3", or "3-clause BSD". This version has been vetted as an Open source license by the OSI as "The BSD License". The Free Software Foundation, which refers to the license as the "Modified BSD License", states that it is compatible with the GNU GPL. The FSF encourages users to be specific when referring to the license by name (i.e. not simply referring to it as "a BSD license" or "BSD-style") to avoid confusion with the original BSD license.

This version allows unlimited redistribution for any purpose as long as its copyright notices and the license's disclaimers of warranty are maintained. The license also contains a clause restricting use of the names of contributors for endorsement of a derived work without specific permission.

2-clause license ("Simplified BSD License" or "FreeBSD License") 

An even more simplified version has come into use, primarily known for its usage in FreeBSD. It was in use there as early as 29 April 1999 and likely well before. The primary difference between it and the New BSD (3-clause) License is that it omits the non-endorsement clause. The FreeBSD version of the license also adds a further disclaimer about views and opinions expressed in the software, though this is not commonly included by other projects.

The Free Software Foundation, which refers to the license as the FreeBSD License, states that it is compatible with the GNU GPL. In addition, the FSF encourages users to be specific when referring to the license by name (i.e. not simply referring to it as "a BSD license" or "BSD-style"), as it does with the modified/new BSD license, to avoid confusion with the original BSD license.

Other projects, such as NetBSD, use a similar 2-clause license. This version has been vetted as an Open source license by the OSI as the "Simplified BSD License."

The ISC license without the 'and/or' wording is functionally equivalent, and endorsed by the OpenBSD project as a license template for new contributions.

0-clause license ("BSD Zero Clause License")

The BSD 0-clause license goes further than the 2-clause license by dropping the requirements to include the copyright notice, license text, or disclaimer in either source or binary forms. Doing so forms a public-domain-equivalent license, the same way as MIT No Attribution License. It is known as "0BSD", "Zero-Clause BSD", or "Free Public License 1.0.0". It was first used by Rob Landley in Toybox.

Other variations 
The SPDX License List contains extra BSD license variations. Examples include:
 , a license with only the source code retaining clause, used by Berkeley Software Design in the 1990s, and later used by the Boost Software License
 , a variation of BSD-2-Clause with a patent grant.
 , a variation of BSD-3-Clause that adds a disclaimer that a piece of software is not designed for use in a nuclear facility.

License compatibility

Commercial license compatibility 
The FreeBSD project argues on the advantages of BSD-style licenses for companies and commercial use-cases due to their license compatibility with proprietary licenses and general flexibility, stating that the BSD-style licenses place only "minimal restrictions on future behavior" and are not "legal time-bombs", unlike copyleft licenses. The BSD License allows proprietary use and allows the software released under the license to be incorporated into proprietary products. Works based on the material may be released under a proprietary license as closed source software, allowing usual commercial usages under them.

FOSS compatibility 
The 3-clause BSD license, like most permissive licenses, is compatible with almost all FOSS licenses (and as well proprietary licenses).

Two variants of the license, the New BSD License/Modified BSD License (3-clause), and the Simplified BSD License/FreeBSD License (2-clause) have been verified as GPL-compatible free software licenses by the Free Software Foundation, and have been vetted as open source licenses by the Open Source Initiative. The original, 4-clause BSD license has not been accepted as an open source license and, although the original is considered to be a free software license by the FSF, the FSF does not consider it to be compatible with the GPL due to the advertising clause.

Reception and usage 

The BSD license family is one of the oldest and most broadly used license families in the Free and open-source software ecosystem. Also, many new licenses were derived or inspired by the BSD licenses. Many FOSS software projects use a BSD license, for instance the BSD OS family (FreeBSD etc.), Google's Bionic or Toybox.  the BSD 3-clause license ranked in popularity number five according to Black Duck Software and sixth according to GitHub data.

See also 

 Comparison of free and open-source software licenses
Software using the BSD license (category)

References

External links 
 Twenty Years of Berkeley Unix: From AT&T-Owned to Freely Redistributable, Marshall Kirk McKusick, in: Open Sources: Voices from the Open Source Revolution, O'Reilly 1999
 The Amazing Disappearing BSD License
 BSD License Definition – by The Linux Information Project (LINFO)

Free and open-source software licenses
Berkeley Software Distribution
Permissive software licenses